The 1934 Nevada gubernatorial election was held on November 6, 1934. Democratic nominee Richard Kirman Sr. defeated incumbent Republican Morley Griswold with 53.94% of the vote.

Primary elections
Primary elections were held on September 4, 1934.

Democratic primary

Candidates
Richard Kirman Sr., former Mayor of Reno
Harley A. Harmon, Chairman of the Nevada Public Service Commission
John A. Cooper
Archie C. Grant
Maurice J. Sullivan, former Lieutenant Governor
Charles L. Richards, former U.S. Representative

Results

General election

Candidates
Major party candidates
Richard Kirman Sr., Democratic
Morley Griswold, Republican 

Other candidates
Lindley C. Branson, Independent

Results

References

1934
Nevada
Gubernatorial